Naim Ul Hasan is an Indian politician and a member of 17th Legislative Assembly of Uttar Pradesh of India. He represents the Noorpur constituency of Uttar Pradesh and is a member of the Samajwadi Party.

Political career
He entered politics from student politics. In 2000, he was elected the President of the students union of Jamia Millia Islamia in Delhi. In 2012 assembly elections, the Samajwadi Party had made him their candidate from Noorpur but was later replaced by the party. However, despite this, the Samajwadi Party gave him the gift of a Ministerial position. He is considered close to SP President and former Chief Minister Akhilesh Yadav.

In 2017 assembly elections, again he was given a ticket by Samajwadi Party from Noorpur seat. In that election, Lokendra Chauhan defeated him by more than 12,000 votes, Lokendra Singh Chauhan of BJP got 79,000 votes while Naim Ul Hasan of SP got 66,436 votes.

In May 2018 bypoll elections of Uttar Pradesh, Samajwadi Party president Akhilesh Yadav made a formal announcement of Naimul Hasan's candidature from Noorpur. Local party officials and some Muslim people in the area have also started opposing him after Hasan got the ticket, in Noorpur area people were opposed to giving tickets by blowing an effigy of Hasan. But despite this, Akhilesh Yadav did not change his decision. However, Hasan won and Sahaspur played an important role in Naim ul Hasan this election and he defeated BJP candidate Avani Singh by a margin of 6,000 votes.

Posts held

References

Uttar Pradesh MLAs 2017–2022
Samajwadi Party politicians from Uttar Pradesh
Living people
Year of birth missing (living people)